Brașovia Brașov was a football team from Brașov founded in 1914 and dissolved in 1937.

History

In their short lifetime they played 6 times in Romanian Football Championship, but without notable performances.

They won the Brașov Regional Championship four times and qualified for the Romanian Champions Final Tournament : 1922–23, 1923–24, 1924–25, 1929–30.

In the new league format of Divizia A they played twice in : 1932–33, 1933–34.

Achievements

Divizia A Semi-final (1) : 1924–25

Bibliography

References

Football clubs in Brașov
Defunct football clubs in Romania
1914 establishments in Romania
Association football clubs established in 1914
1937 disestablishments in Romania
Association football clubs disestablished in 1937